Neusiedl may refer to:

 Klein-Neusiedl, a municipality in the district of Wien-Umgebung in Lower Austria, Austria
 Neusiedl an der Zaya, a town in the district of Gänserndorf in the state of Lower Austria
 Lake Neusiedl, in central Europe
 Neusiedl am See, a town in Burgenland, Austria
 Neusiedl am See District, a district of the state of Burgenland in Austria
 SC Neusiedl am See 1919, an Austrian football club founded in 1919

See also 
 Neusiedler (disambiguation)
 Novosedly (disambiguation) (Czech form)